The 2021 season for  was the 22nd season in the team's existence and the 12th as a UCI ProTeam.

Team roster 

Riders who joined the team for the 2021 season

Riders who left the team during or after the 2020 season

Season victories

References

External links 
 

Team TotalEnergies
2021
Team TotalEnergies